Fiji competed at the 2022 Commonwealth Games in Birmingham, England between 28 July and 8 August 2022. It was Fiji's seventeenth appearance at the Games.

Semesa Naiseruvati and Naibili Vatunisolo were the country's flagbearers during the opening ceremony.

Medalists

Competitors
It is expected that Fiji will send a contingent of 70 to the Games. This was later revised to 64.

The following is the list of number of competitors participating at the Games per sport/discipline.

Athletics

As of 17 June 2022, three athletes (including one para athlete) will take part in the competition.

Men
Track and road events

Women
Field events

Boxing

Two boxers were selected.

Men

Judo

As of 17 June 2022, three judoka will take part in the competition.

Lawn bowls

A squad of ten bowlers (five per gender) was officially selected on 1 March 2022. Elizabeth Moceiwai was later replaced by Radhika Prasad.

Men

Women

Rugby sevens

As of 9 March 2022, Fiji qualified for both the men's and women's tournaments. The men achieved qualification through their positions in the 2018–19 / 2019–20 World Rugby Sevens Series, whereas the women achieved qualification via the 2019 Oceania Women's Sevens Championship (owing to the cancellation of an Oceania qualifier that was scheduled for April 2022).

Both squads were confirmed on 6 July 2022, including several members of the squad that won the Tokyo 2020 men's tournament.

Summary

Men's tournament

Roster
 
Elia Canakaivata
Josua Vakurunabili
Tevita Daugunu
Sevuloni Mocenacagi
Jerry Matana
Semi Kunatani
Jerry Tuwai
Waisea Nacuqu
Filipe Sauturaga
Kaminieli Rasaku
Sireli Maqala
Aminiasi Tuimaba
Vuiviawa Naduvalo

Pool C

Quarterfinals

Semifinals

Finals

Women's tournament

Roster
 
Rusila Nagasau (c)
Raijieli Daveua
Vani Buleki
Vasiti Solikoviti
Verenaisi Ditavutu
Ivamere Rokowati
Lavena Cavuru
Viniana Riwai
Reapi Uluinisau
Lavenia Tinai
Ana Naimasi
Sesenieli Donu
Laisana Moceisawana

Pool B

Semifinals

Finals

Squash

As of 17 June 2022, one player will take part in the competition.

Swimming

As of 17 June 2022, eight swimmers will take part in the competition.

Men

Women

Mixed

Table tennis

Fiji qualified both a men's and a women's team for the table tennis competitions. The selections for both teams and addition of a parasport player were confirmed as of 17 June 2022.

Singles

Doubles

Team

Triathlon

As of 17 June 2022, two triathletes will take part in the competition.

Individual

Weightlifting

Two weightlifters were selected. Helen Seipua qualified via the IWF Commonwealth Ranking List, whereas Taniela Rainibogi was awarded a Bipartite Invitation.

References

External links
Fiji Association of Sports and National Olympic Committee Official site

Nations at the 2022 Commonwealth Games
Fiji at the Commonwealth Games
2022 in Fijian sport